The Coronation may refer to:
The Coronation (play), 1630s play
The Coronation (train), 1937 British railway train
The Coronation (novel), 2000 novel
The Coronation (documentary), 2018 BBC documentary
The Coronation, a private housing estate in Hong Kong

See also
Coronation